Kızım Ve Ben is a 1988 Turkish drama film, directed by Halit Refiğ and starring Gülsen Bubikoglu, Cüneyt Arkın, and Yilmaz Zafer.

Plot

Cast 
 Gülşen Bubikoğlu - Reyhan Olcay
 Cüneyt Arkın - Vedat Olcay
 Nilüfer Öz - Çağla Olcay
 Yılmaz Zafer - Cem Taner
 Kerem Yılmazer 
 Cem Erman
 Devrim Parscan
 Bülent Ufuk
 Faruk Savun
 Yavuz Karakaş
 Mesut Sürmeli
 Ali Demirel
 Nuri Tuğ
 Zeki Sezer
 Orhan Elmas
 Gülten Ceylan
 Mehmet Uğur
 Akif Kilman
 Cihan Alp

References

External links

1988 films
Turkish drama films
1988 drama films
Films directed by Halit Refiğ
Courtroom films
1980s legal films
Films set in Istanbul
Nonlinear narrative films
1980s pregnancy films
Turkish films about revenge
Films about domestic violence
Turkish pregnancy films